The Dekefjellrantane Hills are a group of rock hills at the southern end of the Weyprecht Mountains in Queen Maud Land. They were photographed from the air by the Third German Antarctic Expedition (1938–39). They were mapped by Norwegian cartographers from surveys and air photos by the Sixth Norwegian Antarctic Expedition (1956–60) and named Dekefjellrantane in association with nearby Dekefjellet Mountain.

References

Hills of Queen Maud Land
Princess Astrid Coast